Mount Pearl North, formerly known as Waterford Valley, is a provincial electoral district for the House of Assembly of Newfoundland and Labrador, Canada. As of 2011, there are 9,622 eligible voters living within the district.

This suburban district includes the northern part of the city of Mount Pearl and part of the city of St. John's. The district was created in 2007 using 79 per cent of the old Waterford Valley district and smaller sections of Mount Pearl and Topsail districts. The district was reconfigured in 2015.

Members of the House of Assembly
The district has elected the following Members of the House of Assembly:

Election results

Mount Pearl North

}

|}

|-

|-
 
|New Democratic
|Kurtis Coombs
|align="right"|994
|align="right"|19.55
|align="right"|+13.64
|-

 

|}

|-

|-

|-
 
|New Democratic
|Janice Lockyer
|align="right"|330
|align="right"|5.91

 

|}

Waterford Valley

 

|}

 

|}

 

|}

Waterford-Kenmount

 

|}

 

|}

 

|}

 

|}

References

External links 
Website of the Newfoundland and Labrador House of Assembly
Map of Mount Pearl North riding as of 2015

Mount Pearl
Newfoundland and Labrador provincial electoral districts